Zhang Yining won the title in 2009 but has since retired from international table tennis.

Li Xiaoxia met compatriot Ding Ning in the final of this event. The latter won 12–10, 13–11, 11–9, 8–11, 8–11, 11–7.

Seeds
Based on the ITTF world ranking issued before the Championships, top 64 seeds directly entered the first round of the 128-player sized draw.

  Li Xiaoxia (final)
  Guo Yan (quarterfinals)
  'Ding Ning (world champion)
  Guo Yue (semifinals)  Liu Shiwen (semifinals)  Feng Tianwei (quarterfinals)  Ai Fukuhara (third round)  Wu Yang (quarterfinals)  Kim Kyung-Ah (third round)  Kasumi Ishikawa (fourth round)  Sayaka Hirano (fourth round)  Wang Yuegu (third round)  Li Jiao (third round)  Tie Ya Na (fourth round)  Wu Jiaduo (fourth round)  Park Mi-Young (second round)  Seok Ha-Jung (second round)  Shen Yanfei (fourth round)  Jiang Huajun (fourth round)  Huang Yi-hua (second round)  Li Jiawei (third round)  Fan Ying (quarterfinals)  Yang Ha-Eun (third round)  Yu Mengyu (third round)  Li Jie (fourth round)  Viktoria Pavlovich (fourth round)  Yuka Ishigaki (second round)  Melek Hu (third round)  Li Qian (third round)  Sun Beibei (third round)  Daniela Dodean (second round)  Krisztina Tóth (third round)  Kristin Silbereisen (first round)  Georgina Póta (second round)  Hiroko Fujii (third round)  Elizabeta Samara (second round)  Ni Xia Lian (second round)  Moon Hyun-Jung (second round)  Lee Ho Ching (second round)  Kim Jong (third round)  Misako Wakamiya (second round)  Petra Lovas (second round)  Iveta Vacenovska (second round)  Cheng I-ching (second round)  Zhu Fang (second round)  Wu Xue (second round)  Lau Sui-fei (first round, disqualified)  Anna Tikhomirova (first round)  Song Ma-Eum (second round)  Veronika Pavlovich (first round)  Zhenqi Barthel (second round)  Margaryta Pesotska (second round)  Renata Strbikova (first round)  Ayuka Tanioka (second round)  Gabriela Feher (third round)  Carole Grundisch (first round)  Rūta Paškauskienė (second round)  Sara Ramirez (first round)  Li Qiangbing (third round)  Anamaria Erdelji (second round)  Xian Yi Fang (second round)  Ng Wing Nam (second round)  Natalia Partyka (second round)  Matilda Ekholm (second round)''

Draw

Finals

Top half

Section 1

Section 2

Section 3

Section 4

Bottom half

Section 5

Section 6

Section 7

Section 8

References

External links
Main Draw

-
World